Peter Mikael Hedblom (born 20 January 1970) is a Swedish professional golfer.

Early years
Hedblom was born in Gävle, Sweden. When he was just a few years old, he followed his father Olle, a former bandy player, who later became a golf club professional, to the golf course at Gävle Golf Club. Peter became a member at seven and early showed great talent, but was actively involved in ice hockey before that. His younger sister Marlene did not start her golfing career until the age of 12, but also later became a tournament professional. Through their early careers, the two siblings were supported by their parents, Olle and Agneta.

His father Olle was an elite player himself and once won the Scandinavian Foursome, together with best friend William Löfqvist, who was a well-known goaltender of the Swedish national ice hockey team and the best golfer in northern Sweden. However, Olle's own career was interrupted by a serious leg injury, when he as a bandy coach ran into the ice after the game to talk to the referee, but was hit by the ice machine. Olle's priority became supporting the golf careers of his children

In 1981, 11 years old, Hedblom  won the unofficial Swedish youth championship, Bankboken Cup, at his age level and again in 1984 at the next level.

Hedblom and his father won the Swedish Father and Son Championship four years in a row 1985–1988.

Amateur career
He won the 1987 Swedish Boys under 19 Championship when he was 17. The following year he won the Doral Junior Classic in the United States and the Nordic Championship. At his home course he shot an eight under par 28 on the last nine, to win the Junior District Championship by a big margin.

He was a member of the Continental Europe team that won the 1986 Jacques Léglise Trophy and also played in the event in 1987.

He finished second in the Swedish Junior Stroke-play Championship in 1988 and turned professional later the same year.

Professional career
Hedblom has played mainly on the European Tour, on which he has won three tournaments. His best year-end ranking on the Order of Merit was 29th in 2008. His first win on the European Tour was at the Moroccan Open in 1996.

As a 20-year-old, he qualified for his first Open Championship in 1990, but did not make the cut. In 1996, he qualified for his third Open, to take place at Royal Lytham & St Annes Golf Club, England 18–21 July. In the second round, Hedblom tied the course record 65 and played in the next to last group on Saturday with Jack Nicklaus. Hedblom finally finished a career major championship best tied 7th, with Fred Couples, Greg Norman and Greg Turner, six strokes from winner Tom Lehman.

Hedblom didn't win on the tour again until 2007 when he was victorious at the Maybank Malaysian Open, which was co-sanctioned with the Asian Tour. He picked up his third win at the 2009 Johnnie Walker Championship at Gleneagles, Scotland, his first tour title on European soil, a reward for him, who lost a play-off – the fourth of his career – the previous week in the KLM Open.

During his career, he has also won four tournaments on the Challenge Tour.

He represented Sweden in the 1996 Dunhill Cup, where Sweden advanced to the semifinal, where they lost to the tournament-winning United States team and tied third.

Personal life
Hedblom has not moved abroad, like many other successful Swedish golfers have, and always lived in his hometown Gävle in Sweden, close to his relatives. He has always been a fan of the local ice hockey team, Brynäs IF, who was dominating in Sweden in the 1970s.

He broke his leg in 2001. This mishap came about when he participated in a yearly ice hockey game for golfers.

His son Kasper, born 1994, works as an instructing golf professional at Gävle Golf Club.

When his sister Marlene won the Biarritz Ladies Classic on the Ladies European Tour in 2003, the two of them became the only brother and sister siblings, who have won on the European Tour and Ladies European Tour respectively.

Amateur wins
1987 Swedish Boys Championship
1988 Doral Junior Classic (USA), Nordic Amateur Championship

Professional wins (9)

European Tour wins (3)

1Co-sanctioned by the Asian Tour

European Tour playoff record (0–4)

Challenge Tour wins (4)

Challenge Tour playoff record (1–0)

Sources:

Other wins (2)
2003 Älvkarleby Open (Swedish mini-tour)
2014 SPM Open (Swedish mini-tour Future Series)

Results in major championships

Note: Hedblom never played in the Masters Tournament.

CUT = missed the half-way cut
"T" = tied

Results in World Golf Championships

"T" = Tied

Team appearances
Amateur
European Boys' Team Championship (representing Sweden): 1986, 1987
Jacques Léglise Trophy (representing the Continent Europe): 1986 (winners), 1987

Professional
Dunhill Cup (representing Sweden): 1996

See also
List of golfers with most Challenge Tour wins

References

External links

Swedish male golfers
European Tour golfers
Sportspeople from Gävleborg County
People from Gävle
1970 births
Living people